American cuisine is a style of food preparation originating in the United States of America.

American cuisine may also refer to:

 American Cuisine (film), a 1998 French film
 Cuisine of the Americas, a variety of food preparation styles occurring in the Americas